HMS Tilbury  was a S-class destroyer of the British Royal Navy that served during the First World War.

The boat badge is in the shape of a boar and is in the collection of the National Maritime Museum.

Design and construction
The S-class were intended as a fast ( destroyer for service that would be cheaper than the large V-class destroyers that preceded them and so able to be ordered in large numbers. Three Yarrow boilers fed Parsons geared steam turbines which drove two propeller shafts, and generated , giving the required 36 knot speed.

The design gun armament of the S-class was three  guns and a single 2-pounder (40 mm) "pom-pom" anti-aircraft gun. Torpedo armament was four  torpedo tubes in two twin rotating mounts on the ships' centreline and two  tubes at the break of the forecastle for easily aimed snap-shots in close action. The ship had a crew of 90 officers and men.

On 23 June 1917, the Admiralty placed an order for 36 S-class destroyers under the Twelfth War Programme as a follow-on to the 33 S-class destroyers ordered in May that year under the Eleventh War Programme. Tilbury, one of three S-class destroyers ordered from Swan Hunter in the  Twelfth War Programme, was laid down at their Wallsend shipyard in November 1917. She was launched on 17 June 1918 and completed on 17 September 1918.

Service
On commission, Tilbury was sent to the Mediterranean, and was at Mudros in the Aegean Sea at the end of the war. Tilbury continued as part of the Sixth Destroyer Flotilla in the Mediterranean Fleet through 1919. The Royal Navy had a surplus of modern destroyers following the First World War, and by October 1920, Tilbury was listed as in reserve at the Nore. In 1923, she was in reserve at Portsmouth and in June 1928 was in Maintenance Reserve at Rosyth.

Tilbury was sold to the shipbreakers Ward in February 1931 for scrapping at their Llanelly yard.

References

Bibliography

External links 
 Dreadnought project website

 

1918 ships
S-class destroyers (1917) of the Royal Navy
Ships built on the River Tyne